The Wombles is an animated series for children transmitted in 1997 and 1998, based on the 1973 series created by Elisabeth Beresford. The Wombles had remained popular with children into the 1980s. After FilmFair was acquired by the Canadian company Cinar Films in 1996, a new series of episodes was made, with three new Womble characters. The series is a co-production with Cinar and United Film & Television Productions/HTV Wales, in association with FilmFair Limited and ITV. 52 episodes were produced.

Episodes

Voice artists

Spanish (Spain)
 Demián Velazco Rochwerger as Great Uncle Bulgaria
 Sol Nieto as Madame Cholet
 Emiliano Dionisi as Wellington
 Javier Naldjián as Bungo
 Hernán Bravo as Tobermory 
 Ezequiel Romero as Orinoco
 Horacio Gervais as Tomsk
 Pablo Gandolfo as Stepney
 Emanuel Cáceres as Cairngorm, the MacWomble the Terrible
 Elena Díaz Toledo as Hoboken

References

External links
 

The Wombles
1997 British television series debuts
1998 British television series endings
1990s British animated television series
1997 Canadian television series debuts
1998 Canadian television series endings
1990s Canadian animated television series
British children's animated comedy television series
British television shows based on children's books
Canadian children's animated comedy television series
Canadian television shows based on children's books
ITV children's television shows
Television shows set in London
Television series by Cookie Jar Entertainment
Television series by DHX Media
Television series by ITV Studios
Television shows produced by Harlech Television (HTV)
English-language television shows